The Naberezhnye Chelny constituency (No.29) is a Russian legislative constituency in Tatarstan. The constituency covers Naberezhnye Chelny and northeastern Tatarstan.

Members elected

Election results

1994

|-
! colspan=2 style="background-color:#E9E9E9;text-align:left;vertical-align:top;" |Candidate
! style="background-color:#E9E9E9;text-align:left;vertical-align:top;" |Party
! style="background-color:#E9E9E9;text-align:right;" |Votes
! style="background-color:#E9E9E9;text-align:right;" |%
|-
|style="background-color:"|
|align=left|Vladimir Altukhov
|align=left|Independent
|-
|40.8%
|-
| colspan="5" style="background-color:#E9E9E9;"|
|- style="font-weight:bold"
| colspan="4" |Source:
|
|}

1995

|-
! colspan=2 style="background-color:#E9E9E9;text-align:left;vertical-align:top;" |Candidate
! style="background-color:#E9E9E9;text-align:left;vertical-align:top;" |Party
! style="background-color:#E9E9E9;text-align:right;" |Votes
! style="background-color:#E9E9E9;text-align:right;" |%
|-
|style="background-color:"|
|align=left|Vladimir Altukhov (incumbent)
|align=left|Independent
|
|30.45%
|-
|style="background-color:"|
|align=left|Marklen Fedorov
|align=left|Communist Party
|
|21.95%
|-
|style="background-color:#324194"|
|align=left|Nikolay Belov
|align=left|Union of Workers of ZhKKh
|
|10.48%
|-
|style="background-color:"|
|align=left|Dmitry Fomin
|align=left|Yabloko
|
|9.33%
|-
|style="background-color:"|
|align=left|Nikolay Kolcherin
|align=left|Independent
|
|8.32%
|-
|style="background-color:"|
|align=left|Nikolay Tarakanov
|align=left|Independent
|
|4.35%
|-
|style="background-color:#000000"|
|colspan=2 |against all
|
|12.13%
|-
| colspan="5" style="background-color:#E9E9E9;"|
|- style="font-weight:bold"
| colspan="3" style="text-align:left;" | Total
| 
| 100%
|-
| colspan="5" style="background-color:#E9E9E9;"|
|- style="font-weight:bold"
| colspan="4" |Source:
|
|}

1999

|-
! colspan=2 style="background-color:#E9E9E9;text-align:left;vertical-align:top;" |Candidate
! style="background-color:#E9E9E9;text-align:left;vertical-align:top;" |Party
! style="background-color:#E9E9E9;text-align:right;" |Votes
! style="background-color:#E9E9E9;text-align:right;" |%
|-
|style="background-color:"|
|align=left|Salimkhan Akhmetkhanov
|align=left|Independent
|
|27.06%
|-
|style="background-color:"|
|align=left|Vladimir Kirillov
|align=left|Liberal Democratic Party
|
|15.62%
|-
|style="background-color:"|
|align=left|Leonid Ivanov
|align=left|Independent
|
|14.27%
|-
|style="background-color:"|
|align=left|Khafiz Mirgalimov
|align=left|Communist Party
|
|11.36%
|-
|style="background-color:"|
|align=left|Ildar Urmanov
|align=left|Independent
|
|7.56%
|-
|style="background-color:"|
|align=left|Gulfiya Kashapova
|align=left|Russian All-People's Union
|
|3.12%
|-
|style="background-color:#084284"|
|align=left|Abuzar Mukhametgareyev
|align=left|Spiritual Heritage
|
|2.96%
|-
|style="background-color:#000000"|
|colspan=2 |against all
|
|14.99%
|-
| colspan="5" style="background-color:#E9E9E9;"|
|- style="font-weight:bold"
| colspan="3" style="text-align:left;" | Total
| 
| 100%
|-
| colspan="5" style="background-color:#E9E9E9;"|
|- style="font-weight:bold"
| colspan="4" |Source:
|
|}

2003

|-
! colspan=2 style="background-color:#E9E9E9;text-align:left;vertical-align:top;" |Candidate
! style="background-color:#E9E9E9;text-align:left;vertical-align:top;" |Party
! style="background-color:#E9E9E9;text-align:right;" |Votes
! style="background-color:#E9E9E9;text-align:right;" |%
|-
|style="background-color:"|
|align=left|Oleg Morozov
|align=left|United Russia
|
|49.16%
|-
|style="background:#00A1FF"| 
|align=left|Bulat Yanborisov
|align=left|Party of Russia's Rebirth-Russian Party of Life
|
|13.45%
|-
|style="background-color:"|
|align=left|Leonid Ivanov
|align=left|Independent
|
|7.60%
|-
|style="background-color:"|
|align=left|Khafiz Mirgalimov
|align=left|Communist Party
|
|7.18%
|-
|style="background-color:"|
|align=left|Fail Ibyatov
|align=left|Independent
|
|4.56%
|-
|style="background-color:"|
|align=left|Valery Amzin
|align=left|Liberal Democratic Party
|
|1.75%
|-
|style="background-color:"|
|align=left|Rafail Asylov
|align=left|Independent
|
|0.56%
|-
|style="background-color:#000000"|
|colspan=2 |against all
|
|13.12%
|-
| colspan="5" style="background-color:#E9E9E9;"|
|- style="font-weight:bold"
| colspan="3" style="text-align:left;" | Total
| 
| 100%
|-
| colspan="5" style="background-color:#E9E9E9;"|
|- style="font-weight:bold"
| colspan="4" |Source:
|
|}

2016

|-
! colspan=2 style="background-color:#E9E9E9;text-align:left;vertical-align:top;" |Candidate
! style="background-color:#E9E9E9;text-align:leftt;vertical-align:top;" |Party
! style="background-color:#E9E9E9;text-align:right;" |Votes
! style="background-color:#E9E9E9;text-align:right;" |%
|-
| style="background-color: " |
|align=left|Alfiya Kogogina
|align=left|United Russia
|
|76.05%
|-
|style="background:"| 
|align=left|Tatyana Guryeva
|align=left|Communists of Russia
|
|9.63%
|-
|style="background-color:"|
|align=left|Mansur Garifullin
|align=left|Communist Party
|
|3.74%
|-
|style="background-color:"|
|align=left|Ramil Abdulov
|align=left|A Just Russia
|
|3.32%
|-
|style="background-color:"|
|align=left|Rafael Bayramov
|align=left|Liberal Democratic Party
|
|2.92%
|-
|style="background-color:"|
|align=left|Rafail Nurutdinov
|align=left|Rodina
|
|2.03%
|-
|style="background-color:"|
|align=left|Ruzil Mingalimov
|align=left|People's Freedom Party
|
|1.74%
|-
| colspan="5" style="background-color:#E9E9E9;"|
|- style="font-weight:bold"
| colspan="3" style="text-align:left;" | Total
| 
| 100%
|-
| colspan="5" style="background-color:#E9E9E9;"|
|- style="font-weight:bold"
| colspan="4" |Source:
|
|}

2021

|-
! colspan=2 style="background-color:#E9E9E9;text-align:left;vertical-align:top;" |Candidate
! style="background-color:#E9E9E9;text-align:left;vertical-align:top;" |Party
! style="background-color:#E9E9E9;text-align:right;" |Votes
! style="background-color:#E9E9E9;text-align:right;" |%
|-
|style="background-color: " |
|align=left|Alfiya Kogogina (incumbent)
|align=left|United Russia
|
|67.28%
|-
|style="background-color:"|
|align=left|Tatyana Guryeva
|align=left|Communists of Russia
|
|12.20%
|-
|style="background-color:"|
|align=left|Mansur Garifullin
|align=left|Communist Party
|
|4.91%
|-
|style="background-color: " |
|align=left|Ruslan Nigmatulin
|align=left|Party of Growth
|
|3.75%
|-
|style="background-color:"|
|align=left|Andrey Kolosov
|align=left|Liberal Democratic Party
|
|3.55%
|-
|style="background-color:"|
|align=left|Rashid Mavliyev
|align=left|A Just Russia — For Truth
|
|2.84%
|-
|style="background-color: " |
|align=left|Aleksandr Bykov
|align=left|New People
|
|2.40%
|-
|style="background-color: "|
|align=left|Timur Bikmullin
|align=left|Party of Pensioners
|
|1.94%
|-
| colspan="5" style="background-color:#E9E9E9;"|
|- style="font-weight:bold"
| colspan="3" style="text-align:left;" | Total
| 
| 100%
|-
| colspan="5" style="background-color:#E9E9E9;"|
|- style="font-weight:bold"
| colspan="4" |Source:
|
|}

Notes

References

Russian legislative constituencies
Politics of Tatarstan